Omidiyeh Air Base  is an Iranian air force base located near Omidiyeh in the Khūzestān Province.

See also
 List of longest runways

External links
 Data current as of October 2006.

Airports in Iran
Buildings and structures in Khuzestan Province